Derrick Charles "Bill" Carden CMG (30 October 1921 - 26 April 2006) was a British diplomat and colonial administrator. He was an ambassador to several countries.

Life 
Educated at Marlborough College and Christ Church, Oxford, Carden joined the Sudan Political Service and then served in the Government of Anglo-Egyptian Sudan until Independence.  He entered HM Diplomatic Service in 1956. He served as Director of Middle East Centre for Arab Studies between 1969 and 1973.  He served as Ambassador to the Yemen (1973–1976) and Ambassador to Sudan (1977–1979).

He was appointed Companion, Order of St. Michael and St. George in 1974.

Carden's obituary in The Times commented: "He was in no way ashamed of his "imperialist" past, and was [...] philosophical about the British departure."

References 

1921 births
2006 deaths
People educated at Marlborough College
Alumni of Christ Church, Oxford
British diplomats
Members of HM Diplomatic Service
20th-century British diplomats
Companions of the Order of St Michael and St George
British Arabists
Sudan Political Service officers
Ambassadors of the United Kingdom to Yemen
Ambassadors of the United Kingdom to Sudan